A Sister to Assist 'Er is a 1927 British silent comedy film directed by George Dewhurst and starring Mary Brough, Polly Emery and Humberston Wright. It was based on the play A Sister to Assist 'Er by John le Breton.

Cast
 Mary Brough as Mrs. May 
 Polly Emery as Mrs. Mull 
 Humberston Wright as Mr. Mull 
 A. Bromley Davenport as Jim Harris 
 Alf Goddard as Sailor 
 Jack Harris as Alf

References

Bibliography
 Low, Rachael. History of the British Film, 1918-1929. George Allen & Unwin, 1971.

External links

1927 films
British comedy films
British silent feature films
Films directed by George Dewhurst
British films based on plays
Films set in England
British black-and-white films
1927 comedy films
Films produced by Victor Saville
1920s English-language films
1920s British films
Silent comedy films